The 2022 season is IFK Norrköping's 82nd season in Allsvenskan and their 11th consecutive season in the league. They compete in Allsvenskan and Svenska Cupen. League play started on 3 April and will end on 6 November.

Players

Out on loan

Competitions

Overview

Allsvenskan

League table

Results summary

Results by round

Matches

Svenska Cupen

2021–22

Group stage

Knockout stage

2022–23

Squad statistics

Appearances and goals

|-
|colspan="14"|Players away from IFK Norrköping on loan:

|-
|colspan="14"|Players who appeared for IFK Norrköping no longer at the club:

|}

Goal scorers

Clean sheets

Disciplinary record

References

IFK Norrköping seasons
IFK Norrköping